Muḥammad Manz̤oor Nomānī ( 15 December 1905 – 4 May 1997) was an Indian Islamic scholar. Prominent among his written works are Maariful Hadith, Islam Kya Hai?, and Khomeini and the Iranian Revolution.

He graduated from Darul Uloom Deoband in 1927, where he studied hadith under Anwar Shah Kashmiri. He held the post of Shaykh al-Hadith at Darul Uloom Nadwatul Ulama for four years, and was a close associate of Abul Hasan Ali Nadwi. A founding member of Jamaat-e-Islami in 1941, he was elected the group's Deputy Amir, second to Abul A'la Maududi. However, in 1942, following disagreements with Maududi he led a group in resigning from the organization. Afterwards he became affiliated with the Tablighi Jamaat of Muhammad Ilyas Kandhlawi. He served on the Majlis-e-Shura and Majlis-e-Amilah (Executive Council) of Darul Uloom Deoband and was a member of the Muslim World League.

Biography
Manzoor Nomani was born on 15 December 1905 (18 Shawwal 1323 AH) in Sambhal, United Provinces of Agra and Oudh, British India. His father, Sufi Muhammad Husain, was a moderately wealthy businessman and landlord. Nomani received his primary education in his hometown, graduating from Madrasa Sirajul Uloom Hilali Sarai Sambhal. Later he studied at Darul Uloom Mau. Finally he enrolled at Darul Uloom Deoband where he remained for two years. He graduated in 1345 AH (1927), receiving the highest marks in the examination for dawrah hadith. Among his teachers at Darul Uloom Deoband were Anwar Shah Kashmiri, Azizur Rahman Usmani, and Siraj Ahmad Rashidi.

After completing his studies he taught for three years at Madrasa Chilla, Amroha. Thereafter for four years he held the post of Shaykh al-Hadith at Darul Uloom Nadwatul Ulama, Lucknow.

In 1934 (1353 AH) he established a monthly journal, al-Furqan, from Bareilly. The journal began with a focus towards polemics, but in 1942 (1361 AH) it became more of an academic and religious journal.

Nomani was a founding member of Jamaat-e-Islami. At its Founding Session in August 1941 he led the seven-member committee that proposed Sayyid Abul A'la Maududi as Amir. He himself was selected as Na'ib Amir (Deputy Amir). Six months later, in 1942, Nomani arrived at the Jamaat's Darul Islam community in Pathankot with the intention of permanently settling there. He was appointed the first Muhtasib of Darul Islam. However, due to differences with Maududi he left Jamaat-i Islami in August/September 1942 (Sha'ban 1361 AH) and returned home to Sambhal. Detailing his time with Maududi and the reasons for his departure from Jamaat-i Islami he wrote Maulana Maududi ke sath meri rifaqat ki sarguzasht aur ab mera mauqif (1980).

After leaving Jamaat-e-Islami, he and Abul Hasan Ali Nadwi became affiliated with the Tablighi Jamaat movement. Nomani's compilation of the malfuzat (sayings) of Muhammad Ilyas comes from the period of 1943 to 1944, mostly during Ilyas's final illness.

In 1943 (1362 AH) he was appointed a member of the Majlis-e-Shura of Darul Uloom Deoband. He regularly attended its meetings and those of the Majlis-e-Amilah (Executive Council).

He died in Lucknow on 4 May 1997 and is buried in Aishbagh.

Literary works

Islām kyā hai (1952)
Dīn o sharī‘at (1958)
Qur’ān āp se kyā kihtā hai
Ma‘āriful-Ḥadīs̱
Kalimah-yi ṭayyibah kī ḥaqīqat
Namāz kī ḥaqīqat
Āp Ḥajj kaise karaiṉ
Barakāt-i Ramaẓān
Taḥqīq mas’alah-yi īṣāl-i s̱awāb
Tasawwuf kyā hai
Taẕkirah-yi Imām-i Rabbānī (1959)
Malfūz̤āt-i Maulānā Muḥammad Ilyās (1950)
Bawāriqul-ghaib
Haẓrat Shāh Ismā‘īl Shahīd par mu‘ānidīn ke ilzāmāt (1957)
K͟hāksār taḥrīk
Qur’ān ‘ilm kī roshnī meṉ
Islām aur kufr ke ḥudūd
Qādiyānī kyūṉ Musalmān nahīṉ
Saif-i Yamānī
Maulānā Maudūdī ke sāth merī rifāqat kī sarguzasht aur ab merā mauqif
Shaik͟h Muḥammad ibn ‘Abdul-Wahhāb ke k͟hilāf propaiganḍah aur Hindūstān ke ‘ulama’-i ḥaqq par us ke as̱arāt
Īrānī inqilāb, Imām K͟humainī, aur Shīʻiyat(1984) or Khomeini, Iranian Revolution and Shi'ite faith.

References

Citations

Bibliography
Ullah, Imdad

Hadith scholars
1997 deaths
Indian Islamic studies scholars
1905 births
Critics of Shia Islam
Urdu-language writers from India
Scholars from Uttar Pradesh
Deobandis
Hanafis
People from Sambhal district
Darul Uloom Deoband alumni
Students of Anwar Shah Kashmiri